"Best of KAT-TUN" is the debut album by Japanese boy band KAT-TUN, released in Japan on March 22, 2006 by J-One Records. Despite the title, it is not a greatest hits compilation album. Seven songs on the record, however, were part of KAT-TUN's live tour set list prior to their debut and were already familiar with longtime fans.

The album was part of a tripartite release also consisting of the group's debut single and its tie-in DVD. All three releases were immensely successful on the Oricon albums, singles and DVD charts with "Real Face" and "Real Face Film" being certified as the best-selling single and domestic music DVD of the year respectively. The album itself was the eleventh best-selling album of the year.

Album information
Most of the songs on the album were written for KAT-TUN either by in-house Johnny's Entertainment songwriters or lyricists with a track record of successful hit records for other artists. KAT-TUN members, with the exception of Junnosuke Taguchi, co-wrote 3 songs for the album which were sung as duets. All rap lyrics were also written by Koki Tanaka himself.

Chart performance and reception
In its first week of release, Best of KAT-TUN sold 556,548 copies in Japan, the highest first-week sales for the group to date. The album actually debuted at number 1 on the Oricon daily album charts the day before its release since its official release date fell on a national holiday. Therefore, it didn't officially chart for the week. KAT-TUN were awarded six awards at the 21st Japan Gold Disc Awards (the Japanese equivalent of the Grammy Awards) with Best of KAT-TUN named on "The Best 10 Albums (Domestic)" list. Soon after the home success, Best of KAT-TUN was then released in Taiwan and Thailand in 2006 by EMI Taiwan and EMI Thailand, respectively.

It stayed on the Oricon Top 30 Albums chart for 7 weeks with a total of 743,359 copies sold at the end of its chart-run. Oricon certified the album as the 11th best-selling record of the year and was later certified Triple Platinum by RIAJ denoting over 750,000 shipments.

Track listing
"She Said..." (Ryo Taguchi, Axel G, Katsumi Ohnishi, FLYING GRIND, JOKER) – 3:43
"Never Again" (SPIN, Steven Lee, Joey Carbone FLYING GRIND, JOKER) – 3:49
"I Like It" (Sean Thomas, SPIN, FLYING GRIND) – 4:26
"Miracle" (hamai, Minoru Kumorita, Seikou Nagaoka) - 4:22
"Blue Tuesday" (Yoji Kubota, Arata Tanimoto, Tomoki Ishizuka) – 4:33
"Rhodesia" (CHOKKAKU) - 5:06
"Gold" (Stefan Aberg, Stefan Engblom, SPIN, FLYING GRIND, JOKER) - 4:53
"Wilds of My Heart" (SPIN, zero-rock, Gyo Kitagawa, JOKER) – 3:59
"Special Happiness"1 (K², Gajin, Yoshihiko Chino) – 5:02
"One on One"2 (JOKER, Yuichi Nakamaru, mo'doo-, Izutsu "Growth" Shintaro, Takahito Eguchi)  – 4:58
"Butterfly"3 (Jin Akanishi, Tatsuya Ueda, velvetronica) – 4:52
"Rush of Light" (ma-saya, Watermelon 6, CHOKKAKU) - 4:26
"" (SPIN, Kousuke Morimoto, ha-j, JOKER) - 3:53
"Precious One" (Kaori Niimi, Yuuki Shirai, Yoshinao Mikami, ha-j) - 5:15
"Real Face #1" (Shikao Suga, Tak Matsumoto, Akihito Tokunaga, JOKER) - 4:58

1 Kazuya Kamenashi and Junnosuke Taguchi duet.
2 Koki Tanaka and Yuichi Nakamaru duet.
3 Jin Akanishi and Tatsuya Ueda duet.

Sales and certifications

Chart positions

References

KAT-TUN albums
2006 debut albums